The Easterling was an express passenger train from  with sections for  on the coast of Suffolk and  on the Norfolk coast, dividing at , the only intermediate stop. Introduced by British Railways in 1950, it was relatively short lived and ceased to run in September 1958.

 

Named passenger trains of the United Kingdom